Jean-Pierre Kotze (born 23 April 1994) is a Namibian  cricketer. In January 2018, he was named in Namibia's squad for the 2018 ICC World Cricket League Division Two tournament. In March 2019, he was named in Namibia's squad for the 2019 ICC World Cricket League Division Two tournament. Namibia finished in the top four places in the tournament, therefore gaining One Day International (ODI) status. Kotze made his ODI debut for Namibia on 27 April 2019, against Oman, in the tournament's final.

In June 2019, he was one of twenty-five cricketers to be named in Cricket Namibia's Elite Men's Squad ahead of the 2019–20 international season. He made his Twenty20 International (T20I) debut for Namibia against Botswana on 20 August 2019 during Botswana's tour of Namibia. On debut, he finished on 101 not out, from 43 balls. He became the first batsman for Namibia to score a century in a T20I match.

In August, Kotze was named in Namibia's ODI squad for the 2019 United States Tri-Nation Series. On 20 September 2019, in the match against the United States, he scored 136 runs to become the first batsman for Namibia to score a century in ODI cricket. Later the same month, he was named in Namibia's squad for the 2019 ICC T20 World Cup Qualifier tournament in the United Arab Emirates. Ahead of the tournament, the International Cricket Council (ICC) named him as the key player in Namibia's squad.

In 2021, Kotze retired from cricket at the end of the home season in Namibia to spend more time with his family. However, in April 2022, he announced he was coming out of retirement. A few days later, he was named in Namibia's T20I squad for their series against Uganda.

References

External links
 

1994 births
Living people
Namibian cricketers
Namibia One Day International cricketers
Namibia Twenty20 International cricketers
Place of birth missing (living people)
Wicket-keepers